David or Dave Fleming may refer to:

 David Fleming (priest) (born 1937), Anglican priest
 David Fleming (writer) (1940–2010), English economist, cultural historian and environmental writer
 David Fleming, Lord Fleming (1877–1944), Scottish politician and judge
 David Fleming of Biggar (died 1406), Scottish noble
 David Hay Fleming (1849–1931), Scottish historian and antiquary
 David Thomas Fleming (1861–1938), member of the New Zealand Legislative Council
Dave Fleming (baseball) (born 1969), American baseball pitcher
Dave Fleming (Canadian football) (1944–2020), Canadian football player

See also
Dave Flemming (born 1976), American sportscaster